, also known as  was the 11th legendary Emperor of Japan, according to the traditional order of succession. Less is known about Suinin than his father, and likewise he is also considered to be a "legendary emperor". Both the Kojiki, and the Nihon Shoki (collectively known as the Kiki) record events that took place during Suinin's alleged lifetime. This legendary narrative tells how he ordered his daughter Yamatohime-no-mikoto to establish a new permanent shrine for Amaterasu (the Sun Goddess), which eventually became known as the Ise Grand Shrine. Other events that were recorded concurrently with his reign include the origins of Sumo wrestling in the form of a wrestling match involving Nomi no Sukune.

Suinin's reign is conventionally considered to have been from 29 BC to AD 70. During his alleged lifetime, he fathered seventeen children with two chief wives (empress) and six consorts. One of his sons became the next emperor upon his death in 70 AD, but the location of his father's grave (if any) is unknown. Suinin is traditionally venerated at a memorial Shinto tomb (misasagi) at Nishi-machi, Amagatsuji, Nara City.

Legendary narrative
The Japanese have traditionally accepted this sovereign's historical existence, and a mausoleum (misasagi) for Suinin is currently maintained. There remains no conclusive evidence though that supports this historical figure actually reigning. These chronicles include legends and myths, as well as potential historical facts that have since been exaggerated and/or distorted over time. The records state that Suinin was born sometime in 69 BC, and was the third son of Emperor Sujin. Suinin's empress mother was named Mimaki-hime, who is also former Emperor Kōgen's daughter. Before he was enthroned sometime in 29 BC, his pre-ascension name was Prince Ikumeiribikoisachi no Sumeramikoto.

Suinin is best known for events that surround the founding of the Ise Grand Shrine. The Nihon Shoki states that around 2,000 years ago the Emperor ordered his daughter Yamatohime-no-mikoto, to find a permanent location to worship the goddess Amaterasu-ōmikami (the Sun Goddess). Yamatohime searched for 20 years before settling on a location in Ise, where she established Naiku, the Inner Shrine. She is said to have chosen the location after she heard the voice of Amaterasu say; "(Ise) is a secluded and pleasant land. In this land I wish to dwell." Amaterasu had previously been enshrined and worshipped in Kasanui, which was set up by Suinin's father in an attempt to alleviate a devastating plaque. The Kojiki records that during the reign of Emperor Suinin, the first Saiō (High Priestess) was appointed for Ise Grand Shrine. This recording is also noted by Jien, who was a 13th-century historian and poet. This remains disputed though, as the Man'yōshū (The Anthology of Ten Thousand Leaves) states that the first Saiō to serve at Ise was Princess Ōku. If the latter is true then it would date the Saiō appointments to the reign of Emperor Tenmu ( – 686 AD).

There were other events during Suinin's reign as well that include an Asama Shrine tradition regarding Mount Fuji. The earliest veneration of Konohanasakuya-hime at the base of the mountain was said to be during the 3rd year of Emperor Suinin's reign. The Nihon Shoki also records a wrestling match in which Nomi no Sukune and Taima no Kehaya held during his era, as the origin of Sumai (Sumo wrestling). Meanwhile, Emperor Suinin's family grew to  consist of 17 children with eight variously ranked wives. One of his consorts named Kaguya-hime-no-Mikoto, is mentioned in the Kojiki as a possible basis for the legend of Kaguya-hime regarding the couple's love story. Emperor Suinin died in 70 AD at the age of 138, and his son Prince Ootarashihikoosirowake was enthroned as the next emperor the following year.

Known information

Emperor Suinin is regarded by historians as a "legendary Emperor" as there is insufficient material available for further verification and study. Unlike Emperor Sujin, there is less known about Suinin to possibly support his existence. In either case (fictional or not), the name Suinin-tennō was assigned to him posthumously by later generations. His name might have been regularized centuries after the lifetime ascribed to Suinin, possibly during the time in which legends about the origins of the Yamato dynasty were compiled as the chronicles known today as the Kojiki. Suinin's longevity was also written down by later compilers, who may have unrealistically extended his age to fill in time gaps. While the actual site of Suinin's grave is not known, the Emperor is traditionally venerated at a memorial Shinto shrine (misasagi) at Nishi-machi, Amagatsuji, Nara City. The Imperial Household Agency designates this location as Suinin's mausoleum, and is formally named Sugawara no Fushimi no higashi no misasagi.

While the Ise Grand Shrine is traditionally said to have been established in the 1st century BC, other dates in the 3rd and 4th centuries have also been put forward for the establishment of Naikū and Gekū respectively. The first shrine building at Naikū was allegedly erected by Emperor Tenmu (678-686), with the first ceremonial rebuilding being carried out by his wife, Empress Jitō, in 692. Outside of the Kiki, the reign of Emperor Kinmei ( – 571 AD) is the first for which contemporary historiography has been able to assign verifiable dates. The conventionally accepted names and dates of the early Emperors were not confirmed as "traditional" though, until the reign of Emperor Kanmu between 737 and 806 AD.

Consorts and children  

Emperor Suinin had two chief wives (aka Empress), it is recorded in the Kiki that the first empress was named Saho. Not much is known about her other than that her father was Emperor Kaika's son and she allegedly died sometime in 34 AD. As with the first empress there is also not much known about Suinin's second chief wife Hibasu. She was the daughter Prince Tanba-no-Michinoushi, who was Prince Hikoimasu's son and Emperor Kaika's grandson. Hibasu's third son later became known as Emperor Keikō (the next emperor), she allegedly died sometime in 61 AD. Suinin also had six named consorts with an additional one remaining unknown. Prince Tanba-no-Michinoushi (previously mentioned), was also the father to three of Suinin's consorts. In all the Emperor's family consisted of 17 children with these variously ranked wives.

Spouse

Concubines

Issue

See also
 Emperor of Japan
 List of Emperors of Japan
 Imperial cult

Notes

References

Further reading
 Aston, William George. (1896).  Nihongi: Chronicles of Japan from the Earliest Times to A.D. 697. London: Kegan Paul, Trench, Trubner. 
 Brown, Delmer M. and Ichirō Ishida, eds. (1979).  Gukanshō: The Future and the Past. Berkeley: University of California Press. ; 
 Chamberlain, Basil Hall. (1920). The Kojiki. Read before the Asiatic Society of Japan on April 12, May 10, and June 21, 1882; reprinted, May, 1919. 
 Ponsonby-Fane, Richard Arthur Brabazon. (1959).  The Imperial House of Japan. Kyoto: Ponsonby Memorial Society. 
 . (1962).   Studies in Shinto and Shrines. Kyoto: Ponsonby Memorial Society. 
 Titsingh, Isaac. (1834). Nihon Ōdai Ichiran; ou,  Annales des empereurs du Japon.  Paris: Royal Asiatic Society, Oriental Translation Fund of Great Britain and Ireland. 
 Varley, H. Paul. (1980).  Jinnō Shōtōki: A Chronicle of Gods and Sovereigns. New York: Columbia University Press. ;

External links
Ise Shrine - Naiku, official website

 
 

Legendary Emperors of Japan
1st-century BC legendary rulers
People of Yayoi-period Japan
1st-century monarchs in Asia
1st-century BC Japanese monarchs
1st-century Japanese monarchs